Aedes (Christophersiomyia) thomsoni is a species complex of zoophilic mosquito belonging to the genus Aedes. It is found in Sri Lanka, and India.

References

External links
Christophersiomyia Barraud, 1923 - Mosquito Taxonomic Inventory

thomsoni
Insects described in 1905